Gregory Ibach is an American farmer and government official from Sumner, Nebraska, who served as the Under Secretary of Agriculture for Marketing and Regulatory Programs. Prior to assuming the role, he was the Nebraska director of agriculture.

Early life and education 
In 1980 Ibach graduated from Sumner-Eddyville-Miller High School. He earned a Bachelor of Science in Agriculture from the University of Nebraska–Lincoln with majors in animal science and agricultural economics.

Career 
Ibach spent his early career with Farm Credit Services, working as a loan officer and eventually becoming assistant vice president. He is a past president of the National Association of State Departments of Agriculture. Ibach was named Nebraska Director of Agriculture by Nebraska Governor Dave Heineman in June 2005 and was the longest-serving state agriculture director in Nebraska history. Prior to this appointment, he had spent over six years as Nebraska's Assistant Director of Agriculture.

Ibach was nominated by President Donald Trump to become Under Secretary of Agriculture for Marketing and Regulatory Programs on September 5, 2017, and was confirmed by voice vote in the United States Senate on October 26, 2017. He left office on January 20, 2021.

On March 4, 2021, the University of Nebraska-Lincoln announced that their Institute of Agriculture and Natural Resources had appointed Greg Ibach as the inaugural Under Secretary in Residence, who had started this half-time position on February 1, 2021.

Personal life 
Ibach is married to wife Teresa. They have three adult children and live on their family farm and ranch in Sumner, Nebraska.

Awards 
Ibach has been inducted into the Nebraska Hall of Agricultural Achievement and recognized for contributions to agriculture by the University of Nebraska–Lincoln.

References

External links
 Biography at the National Association of State Departments of Agriculture
 Biography at Ballotpedia

Living people
United States Department of Agriculture officials
Trump administration personnel
Farmers from Nebraska
State cabinet secretaries of Nebraska
University of Nebraska alumni
People from Dawson County, Nebraska
Year of birth missing (living people)